is a railway station on the Nemuro Main Line of JR Hokkaido located in Akabira, Hokkaidō, Japan.

Structure

Service

Nearby stations 

Railway stations in Hokkaido Prefecture
Railway stations in Japan opened in 1913